Lists of adaptations of the works of Agatha Christie:

Film

Television
 1938 Love from a Stranger (Based on the stage play of the same name from the short story Philomel Cottage)
 1947 Love from a Stranger
 1949 Ten Little Indians
 1955 Spider's Web (Based on the stage play of the same name)
 1959 Ten Little Indians
 1970 The Murder at the Vicarage
 1980 Why Didn't They Ask Evans?
 1981 The Seven Dials Mystery
 1982 Spider's Web
 1982 The Agatha Christie Hour
 1982 Murder is Easy
 1982 The Witness for the Prosecution
 1983 The Secret Adversary
 1983 Partners in Crime
 1983 A Caribbean Mystery
 1983 Sparkling Cyanide
 1985 Murder with Mirrors
 1985 Thirteen at Dinner
 1986 Dead Man's Folly
 1986 Murder in Three Acts
 1989 The Man in the Brown Suit
 1997 The Pale Horse
 2001 Murder on the Orient Express
 2003 Sparkling Cyanide
 2007 Hercule Poirot's Christmas (A French film adaptation)
 2015 Partners in Crime
 2015 And Then There Were None
 2016 The Witness For The Prosecution
 2018 Ordeal by Innocence
 2018 The ABC Murders
 2018 Ms. Ma, Nemesis
 2020 The Pale Horse
 2022 Why Didn't They Ask Evans?

Miss Marple television series
Episodes of the television series Miss Marple include:
 1984 The Body in the Library
 1985 The Moving Finger
 1985 A Murder is Announced
 1985 A Pocket Full of Rye
 1986 The Murder at the Vicarage
 1987 Sleeping Murder
 1987 At Bertram's Hotel
 1987 Nemesis
 1987 4.50 from Paddington
 1989 A Caribbean Mystery
 1991 They Do It with Mirrors
 1992 The Mirror Crack'd from Side to Side

Agatha Christie's Marple television series
Episodes of the television series Agatha Christie's Marple include:
 2004 The Body in the Library
 2004 The Murder at the Vicarage
 2004 4.50 from Paddington
 2005 A Murder is Announced
 2005 Sleeping Murder
 2006 The Moving Finger
 2006 By the Pricking of My Thumbs
 2006 The Sittaford Mystery
 2007 Towards Zero
 2007 Nemesis
 2007 At Bertram's Hotel
 2007 Ordeal by Innocence
 2009 A Pocket Full of Rye
 2009 Murder is Easy
 2009 They Do It with Mirrors
 2009 Why Didn't They Ask Evans?
 2010 The Mirror Crack'd from Side to Side
 2010 The Secret of Chimneys
 2010 The Blue Geranium
 2010 The Pale Horse
 2013 A Caribbean Mystery
 2013 Greenshaw's Folly
 2013 Endless Night

Agatha Christie's Poirot television series
Episodes of the television series Agatha Christie's Poirot include:
 1989 The Adventure of the Clapham Cook
 1989 Murder in the Mews
 1989 The Adventure of Johnnie Waverly
 1989 Four and Twenty Blackbirds
 1989 The Third Floor Flat
 1989 Triangle at Rhodes
 1989 Problem at Sea
 1989 The Incredible Theft
 1989 The King of Clubs
 1989 The Dream
 1990 Peril at End House
 1990 The Veiled Lady
 1990 The Lost Mine
 1990 The Cornish Mystery
 1990 The Disappearance of Mr. Davenhiem
 1990 Double Sin
 1990 The Adventure of the Cheap Flat
 1990 The Kidnapped Prime Minister
 1990 The Adventure of the Western Star
 1990 The Mysterious Affair at Styles
 1991 How Does Your Garden Grow?
 1991 The Million Dollar Bond Robbery
 1991 The Plymouth Express
 1991 Wasps' Nest
 1991 The Tragedy at Marsdon Manor
 1991 The Double Clue
 1991 The Mystery of the Spanish Chest
 1991 The Theft of the Royal Ruby
 1991 The Affair at the Victory Ball
 1991 The Mystery of Hunter's Lodge
 1992 The ABC Murders
 1992 Death in the Clouds
 1992 One, Two, Buckle My Shoe
 1993 The Adventure of the Egyptian Tomb
 1993 The Under dog
 1993 The Yellow Iris
 1993 The Case of the Missing Will
 1993 The Adventure of the Italian Nobleman
 1993 The Chocolate Box
 1993 Dead Man's Mirror
 1993 The Jewel Robbery at the Grand Metropolitan
 1995 Hercule Poirot's Christmas
 1995 Hickory Dickory Dock
 1996 Murder on the Links
 1996 Dumb Witness
 2000 The Murder of Roger Ackroyd
 2000 Lord Edgware Dies
 2001 Evil Under the Sun
 2002 Murder in Mesopotamia
 2003 Five Little Pigs
 2003 Sad Cypress
 2004 Death on the Nile
 2004 The Hollow
 2006 The Mystery of the Blue Train
 2006 Cards on the Table
 2006 After the Funeral
 2006 Taken at the Flood
 2008 Mrs. McGinty's Dead
 2008 Cat Among the Pigeons
 2008 Third Girl
 2009 Appointment with Death
 2010 Three Act Tragedy
 2010 Hallowe'en Party
 2010 Murder on the Orient Express
 2011 The Clocks
 2013 Elephants Can Remember 
 2013 The Big Four
 2013 Dead Man's Folly 
 2013 The Labours of Hercules 
 2013 Curtain

television series 
The French-language television series  adapted thirty-six of Christie's works of detective fiction. It included a four-part mini-series set in 1930s France (2006) and a distinct two-series run with Series One also set in 1930s France (2009–2012, 11 episodes) and Series Two set in mid-1950s to 1960s France (2013–2020, 27 episodes).

BBC Radio
Many of Christie's novels have been adapted for BBC Radio over the course of several years.
The most prominent productions were the dramatisations of the Poirot and Miss Marple stories:

Poirot
(Starring John Moffatt as Poirot, unless otherwise stated)

The Mysterious Affair at Styles
Murder on the Links
The Adventure of the Christmas Pudding
The Murder of Roger Ackroyd
The Mystery of the Blue Train (* Maurice Denham as Poirot)
Peril at End House
Lord Edgware Dies (aka Thirteen at Dinner)
Murder in Mesopotamia
Murder on the Orient Express
Three Act Tragedy
Death in the Clouds
The A.B.C. Murders
Dumb Witness
Cards on the Table
Death on the Nile
Appointment with Death
Hercule Poirot's Christmas (* Peter Sallis as Poirot)
One, Two, Buckle My Shoe
Sad Cypress
Evil Under the Sun
Five Little Pigs
Taken at the Flood
Mrs McGinty's Dead
After the Funeral
Dead Man's Folly
Hallowe'en Party
Elephants Can Remember

Miss Marple
(Starring June Whitfield as Miss Marple)

The Body in the Library
The Murder at the Vicarage
4.50 from Paddington
A Murder Is Announced
Sleeping Murder
The Moving Finger
At Bertram's Hotel
Nemesis
A Caribbean Mystery
They Do It With Mirrors
The Mirror Crack'd From Side To Side
A Pocket Full of Rye

Notable others
Endless Night
Starring Jonathan Forbes as Mike and Lizzy Watts as Ellie

Towards Zero
Starring Hugh Bonneville as Nevile and Marcia Warren as Lady Tresselian

The Sittaford Mystery
Starring Melinda Walker as Emily Trefusis, Stephen Tompkinson as Charles Enderby, John Moffatt as Mr. Rycroft and Geoffrey Whitehead as Inspector Narracott

And Then There Were None
Geoffrey Whitehead as Justice Wargrave, Lyndsey Marshal as Vera Claythorne, Alex Wyndham as Philip Lombard, John Rowe as Dr. Armstrong, and Joanna Monro as Emily Brent

Sparkling Cyanide
Starring Naomi Frederick as Iris and Amanda Drew as Ruth

Ordeal by Innocence
Starring Mark Umbers as Arthur Calgary and Jacqueline Defferary as Gwenda

Graphic novels
Euro Comics India began issuing a series of graphic novel adaptations of Christie's work in 2007.
 2007 The Murder on the Links. Adapted by François Rivière, illustrated by Marc Piskic
 2007 Murder on the Orient Express. Adapted by François Rivière, illustrated by Solidor (Jean-François Miniac).
 2007 Death on the Nile. Adapted by Francois Riviere, illustrated by Solidor (Jean-François Miniac)
 2007 The Secret of Chimneys. Adapted by François Rivière, illustrated by Laurence Suhner
 2007 The Murder of Roger Ackroyd. Adapted and illustrated by Bruno Lachard
 2007 The Mystery of the Blue Train. Adapted and illustrated by Marc Piskic
 2007 The Man in the Brown Suit. Adapted and illustrated by Alain Paillou
 2007 The Big Four. Adapted by Hichot and illustrated by Bairi
 2007 The Secret Adversary. Adapted by François Rivière and illustrated by Frank Leclercq
 2007 The Murder at the Vicarage. Adapted and illustrated by "Norma"
 2007 Murder in Mesopotamia. Adapted by François Rivière and illustrated by Chandre
 2007 And Then There Were None. Adapted by François Rivière and illustrated by Frank Leclercq
 2007 Endless Night. Adapted by Francois Rivière and illustrated by Frank Leclercq
 2008 Ordeal by Innocence. Adapted and illustrated by Chandre
 2008 Hallowe'en Party. Adapted and illustrated by Chandre
 2008 Peril at End House Adapted by Thierry Jollet and illustrated by Didier Quella-Guyot
 2009 Dumb Witness Adapted and illustrated by "Marek"
 2010 Cards on the Table Adapted and illustrated by Frank Leclercq
2010 Five Little Pigs Adapted by Miceal O'Griafa, David Charrier
 2012 Dead Man's Folly Adapted and illustrated by Marek
 2013 Evil Under the Sun Adapted by Thierry Jollet and illustrated by Didier Quella-Guyot

Video games
 1988 The Scoop (published by Spinnaker Software and Telarium) (PC)
 2005 Agatha Christie: And Then There Were None (PC and Wii).
 2006 Agatha Christie: Murder on the Orient Express (PC)
 2007 Agatha Christie: Death on the Nile (I-Spy hidden-object game) (PC)
 2007 Agatha Christie: Evil Under the Sun (PC and Wii)
 2008 Agatha Christie: Peril at End House (I-Spy hidden-object game)
 2009 Agatha Christie: The ABC Murders (DS)
 2009 Agatha Christie: Dead Man's Folly (I-Spy hidden-object game) (PC)
 2010 Agatha Christie 4:50 from Paddington (I-Spy hidden-object game) (PC)
 2016 Agatha Christie: The ABC Murders (PC, Nintendo Switch, PlayStation 4 and Xbox One)
 2021 Agatha Christie – Hercule Poirot: The First Cases (PC, Nintendo Switch, PlayStation 4 and Xbox One)

Animation
In 2004, the Japanese broadcasting company Nippon Hōsō Kyōkai turned Poirot and Marple into animated characters in the anime series Agatha Christie's Great Detectives Poirot and Marple, introducing Mabel West (daughter of Miss Marple's mystery-writer nephew Raymond West, a canonical Christie character) and her duck Oliver as new characters.

References

Agatha Christie